Psychotic Genius is the third album released by rapper, Ganksta NIP. It was released on February 20, 1996 through Rap-a-Lot Records and was produced by Mike Dean, Mike B, Gregory Jackson, Mezeio Jackson, Swift and N.O. Joe. The album peaked at #32 on the Top R&B/Hip-Hop Albums and #19 on the Top Heatseekers.

Track listing
 "Uncle Sam" – 5:51
 "Psychotic Genius" – 4:25
 "Small Town Killas" – 5:58
(Feat. Point Blank)
Written-By – Reginald Gilland
 "Peep Da Game" – 5:32
 "Slaughterhouse" – 5:27
 "Goin To Da Death" – 4:59
Producer, Written-By – Mezeio Jackson
 "Psychflow" – 3:47
 "Hood Talez" – 5:36
(Feat. Street Military)
 "Peace To Da Young G's" – 5:24
 "Crimewave" – 5:10
 "Hollograms" – 4:55
Producer – N.O. Joe
Written-By – Joe Johnson*
 "Murda After Midnite" – 5:20

Personnel
Engineer, Mastered By – Mike Dean
Mastered By – Anthony Valcic
Producer – Mike B.(tracks: 2, 4, 8), Swift (tracks: 1, 5, 7, 9)
Producer, Written-By – Gregory Jackson (tracks: 3, 10, 12)
Written-By – Jonathan Catalon(tracks: 1, 5, 7, 9), Michael Banks* (tracks: 2, 4, 8), Rowdy Williams

Album Chart Positions

1996 albums
Ganksta N-I-P albums
Rap-A-Lot Records albums
Albums produced by Mike Dean (record producer)
Albums produced by N.O. Joe
Gangsta rap albums by American artists
Horrorcore albums
G-funk albums